Brickellia reticulata is a Mexican species of flowering plants in the family Asteraceae]. It is native to the state of México in the central part of the republic of Mexico near the city of Temascaltepec.

References

External links
Photo of herbarium specimen at Missouri Botanical Garden

reticulata
Flora of the State of Mexico
Plants described in 1838